The Pact is a BBC One television drama series written and created by Pete McTighe and made and filmed in Wales. Produced by Little Door Productions, it began broadcasting on BBC One on 17 May 2021. On 6 April 2022, a second series was announced, focusing on a new cast and story, which premiered on 24 October 2022.

Synopsis

Series 1 

Four friends, Anna, Nancy, Cat and Louie, work in a 100-year-old family brewery in mid-Wales. The owner, Louie's brother Arwel, has recently retired and has put his son, Jack, in charge. Jack is a cocaine addict and treats his staff with contempt. During the centenary party, the four abduct the drunken, stoned Jack and drive him to the woods. They photograph him in a partly undressed pose then leave. When they return to check on him, they find him dead. They make a pact not to disclose their involvement.

Series 2 

The second series focuses on a new cast and story. Christine, a social worker, and her children Will, Jamie and Megan are trying to move on from the death of a fourth sibling, Liam, through overdose. However, a stranger comes to town claiming a connection to each of them; this tests their family loyalties.

Cast

Series 1 
 Laura Fraser as Anna
 Julie Hesmondhalgh as Nancy
 Eiry Thomas as Louie
 Heledd Gwynn as Cat
 Eddie Marsan as Arwel 
 Jason Hughes as Max 
 Aneurin Barnard as Jack
 Adrian Edmondson as Richard
 Rakie Ayola as Detective Superintendent Holland
 Gabrielle Creevy as Tamsin 
 Aled ap Steffan as Ryan
 Abbie Hern as Tish
 Alexandria Riley as Detective Constable Anford
 Mark Lewis Jones as Father Martin 
 Richard Elis as Gareth 
 Ben McGregor as Detective Constable Griffiths
 Sophie Melville as Mandy Thomas
 Elin Phillips as Rose

Series 2 
 Rakie Ayola as Christine Rees
 Jordan Wilks as Connor
 Mali Ann Rees as Megan Rees
 Lloyd Everitt as Will Rees
 Aaron Anthony as Jamie Rees
 Lisa Palfrey as Beth
 Jacob Ifan as Gethin
 Rebekah Murrell as Samantha
 Kristy Phillips as Kayla
 Christian Patterson as Joe
 Matthew Gravelle as D.S Pritchard
 Elizabeth Berrington as Kate
 Callum Hymers as Owain
 Huw Novelli as Lloyd
 Nick Hywell as Alec
 Marsha Miller as Carol
 Steven Mackintosh as Harry
 Kaylen Luke as Alfie

Production
Production of the first series of The Pact began in September 2020 and filming took place on location at the Rhymney Brewery, Blaenavon, the Brecon Beacons National Park, the Pontsarn Viaduct, Merthyr Tydfil, the Pontsticill Reservoir, Whitecross Street in Monmouth, and St Mary's Church, Marshfield in Newport, Wales.

Series 2 was filmed in Cardiff and on the Vale of Glamorgan coast. The Rees family home was in Llantwit Major, with other coastal scenes being filmed in Ogmore-by-Sea and other scenes take place at Llantwit Major Beach and Dunraven Bay. Filming also took place in Penarth, Penarth Pier, Porthcawl, Swanbridge Bay Beach and Barry, Vale of Glamorgan.

Episodes

Series 1 (2021)

Series 2 (2022)

Broadcast
The first series of The Pact was broadcast every Monday and Tuesday on BBC One between 17 May 2021 and 1 June 2021.

The second series was broadcast every Monday on BBC One between 24 October 2022 and 28 November 2022.

Reception
Writing for The Guardian, Rebecca Nicholson gave the first series three out of five stars, stating that it saw "a starry cast and a hint of mystery". The Independent critic Sean O'Grady awarded four out of five stars, praising the "strong" writing and cast, but stating that "the premise does seem far-fetched." Anita Singh of The Daily Telegraph wrote similarly of The Pact, describing it as a "Welsh Big Little Lies" where "realism wasn't a high priority".

Alison Rowat in The Herald found series 2 “as gripping as the first one”. Jesper Rees in The Daily Telegraph criticised the soundtrack  “which omnipresently pumps out dull doomy chords in the background, a bit like musical cloud cover. Talking of clouds, the shoot in picturesque spots such as Penarth and Margam Abbey seems to have happened under Glamorgan’s very greyest skies.”

References

External links
 

2021 British television series debuts
2020s British drama television series
BBC television dramas
English-language television shows
Television shows set in Wales